Carlos Alejandro Castro Manriquez (born March 6, 1994) is an American professional boxer who has held the WBC Continental Americas featherweight title since August 2021.

Early life
Born in Ciudad Obregón, Castro was brought to the United States as a young child and settled in Phoenix, Arizona. His father introduced him to boxing around the age of seven.

Professional career
Castro made his professional debut on June 16, 2016, scoring a four-round unanimous decision (UD) victory against Tony Green at the Celebrity Theatre in Phoenix, Arizona.

After compiling a record of 19–0 (8 KOs), he returned to the Celebrity Theatre to face Alexis Santiago for the vacant WBC–USNBC super bantamweight title on February 24, 2018. After Castro landed a series of combinations in the tenth and final round, Santiago's corner threw in the towel at 1 minute 50 seconds into the round, handing Castro a technical knockout (TKO) victory and his first professional championship.

In June of that year, it was announced that Castro had signed a multi-year contract with Bob Arum's Top Rank promotional company. Following a UD victory against Diuhl Olguin in a non-title fight in August, Castro defeated Genesis Servania via UD on February 10, 2019, capturing the vacant WBC Continental Americas super bantamweight title at the Save Mart Arena in Fresno, California. The judges' scorecards read 100–90, 99–91 and 98–92.

After three more victories, two of which were title defenses, Castro moved up to the featherweight division. His first bout at the weight was a fourth-round stoppage victory against Cesar Juarez in July 2020. Castro's next fight came against former two-weight interim world champion Óscar Escandón on August 21, 2021 at the T-Mobile Arena in Paradise, Nevada. In a bout that served as part of the undercard for Manny Pacquiao vs. Yordenis Ugás, Castro scored knockdowns in rounds seven and ten, the latter of which promoted the referee to call a halt to the contest at 1 minute 8 seconds into the round, awarding Castro the vacant WBC Continental Americas featherweight title victory via tenth-round knockout (KO).

Professional boxing record

References

External links
 

Living people
1994 births
Boxers from Sonora
American male boxers
Super-bantamweight boxers
Featherweight boxers
People from Ciudad Obregón
Mexican emigrants to the United States
American boxers of Mexican descent
Boxers from Arizona
Sportspeople from Phoenix, Arizona